There are at least six members of the water-lily and watershields order, Nymphaeales, found in Montana. Some of these species are exotics (not native to Montana) and some species have been designated as Species of Concern.

Hornworts
Family:  Ceratophyllaceae
Ceratophyllum demersum, common hornwort

Water-lilies

Family:  Nymphaeaceae
Nymphaea odorata, American water-lily
Nymphaea leibergii, pygmy water-lily
Nuphar variegata, varigated pond-lily
Nuphar polysepala, yellow pond-lily

Watershields
Family: Cabombaceae
Brasenia schreberi, watershield

See also
 List of dicotyledons of Montana

Notes

Freshwater plants
Nymphaeaceae
Montana